Gibson Lake is a lake in geographic Hutton Township in Greater Sudbury in Northeastern Ontario, Canada. It is in the Great Lakes Basin and is on the Vermilion River, which flows via the Spanish River to Lake Huron. The Canadian National Railway transcontinental main line, used by freight traffic and the Canadian passenger train, travels along the eastern shore of the lake.

See also
List of lakes in Ontario

References

Other map sources:

Lakes of Greater Sudbury